Cheshire High School is a comprehensive public high school serving approximately 1,538 students; it is the sole comprehensive high school of Cheshire Public Schools.

It is the town's sole public high school.

As of 2016, Cheshire High School has approximately 1,538 students, 104 faculty members, six guidance counselors, three assistant principals, and one principal. The school is accredited by the New England Association of Secondary Schools and Colleges.

Renovations

The last renovations to Cheshire High School were completed during the summer of 2000. Prior to this, the school was last renovated in 1971. Designed by DeCarlo & Doll, Inc. and built by Trataros Construction, Inc., the renovations added  of space at a cost of over eight million dollars.

 Thirteen classrooms, which now primarily house math and foreign language classes
 Two computer labs
 A common area, which primarily serves as a cafeteria
 Administrative and guidance offices

A new band room was also built in the rear of the building. Additionally, three science classrooms were renovated, faculty parking lots were created, and landscaping work was done in the front of school, around the new wing. As this new addition faced the main road, it became the new facade and main entrance to the school. Previously, the main entrance was tucked away at the south side of the building.

In 2011, the Technology Department received a $73,000 grant to improve its video studio. Cheshire High School offers multiple media-based classes which use the studio, including video production and news media production. Graduates had been excelling at media colleges for years prior to the renovation and now are doing so to a greater extent.

Athletics

Cheshire High School participates in the Southern Connecticut Conference.

Baseball
The Rams baseball team won the class LL state championship in 2018.

Softball
The Rams softball team won their first class LL state championship in 2016 during their first ever unbeaten season finishing 27-0.

Arts
The Ram Band marched in parades such as the 43rd Presidential Inaugural Parade, the 1999 Tournament of Roses Parade, and the 2000 Macy's Thanksgiving Day Parade.

Cheshire's Winter Percussion Ensemble won first place two years in a row (2008–09) at MAC Championships. They also won USSBA National Championships in the AAA category in 2011.

Notable alumni

 Harvey C. Barnum, Jr., colonel in the United States Marine Corps and Medal of Honor recipient
 Ron Palillo, actor
 Paul Pasqualoni, head coach of the University of Connecticut football team
 Legs McNeil, journalist and co-founder of PUNK
 Sunil Gulati, president of the United States Soccer Federation; economics faculty member at Columbia University
 Alan Hoskins, CEO of Energizer
 Anjul Nigam, actor
 Brian Leetch, professional hockey player
 Brad Ausmus, Major League Baseball All-Star catcher and manager
 Michael Chasen, co-founder and CEO of ClassEDU and co-founder of Blackboard Inc.
Marc Tyler Nobleman, author
 Adam Kaloustian, television producer
 Sabrina Cass, Olympic skier
 Sean Clements, television writer, producer, comedian, actor, and host of Hollywood Handbook

References

External links 

 

Cheshire, Connecticut
Schools in New Haven County, Connecticut
Public high schools in Connecticut